Bugallo is a surname. Notable people with the surname include:

 Agustín Bugallo (born 1995), Argentine field hockey player
 Celso Bugallo (born 1947), Spanish actor

Galician-language surnames